Wilcock is a Norman surname. It may refer to the following:

C. C. Wilcock (born 1946), American taxonomist
Clifford Wilcock (1898–1962), British engineer, company director and politician
Dennis Wilcock, second singer for the band Iron Maiden
George Wilcock (1890–1962), English footballer
Gordon Wilcock (born 1950), English cricketer
Greg Wilcock, Australian diplomat
John Wilcock (1927–2018), British journalist
J. Rodolfo Wilcock (1919–1978), Argentinian author, poet, critic and translator
Justin Wilcock (born 1979), American diver
Ken Wilcock (born 1934), British sprinter
Peter Wilcock (born 1945), English professional golfer

See also
Wilcox (disambiguation)
Wilcox (surname)
Willcock
Willcocks
Willcox (disambiguation)
Willcox (surname)
Willock
Wilcoxon

Patronymic surnames